The Palazzo Fineschi Sergardi is a 16th-century urban palace located the Pian dei Mantellini neighborhood of the city of Siena, region of Tuscany, Italy. It is located near the Palazzo Celsi Pollini.

History
The palace was commissioned in the 16th century from designs by Bartolomeo Neroni.  In the following centuries it also became a convent, and was acquired in the 17th century by the Fineschi Sergardi family, who refurbished the structures. Today it serves as a boutique hotel.

References

Palaces in Siena
Houses completed in the 16th century